, also known as Kimura Sehei stable, was a heya or stable of sumo wrestlers, part of the Tatsunami ichimon or affiliated group of stables.

History
The original Kise stable (which had no connection to the current incarnation founded by the former Higonoumi) was led by the chief referee Kimura Shōnosuke and several other referees also took charge of it (a practice no longer permitted). Its ninth master was however a former wrestler, former maegashira Katsuragawa, who re–established the stable in 1958. He resigned voluntarily from the Sumo Association in 1967 and his son-in-law, maegashira Kiyonomori retired from active competition and took over from him. It was the only stable to allow amateurs as well as professionals to train in it, and it was also open to practitioners of other martial arts such as kendo. Kiyonomori led the stable until he reached the mandatory retirement age in 2000, at which point the stable folded, having produced no sekitori since the early 1980s.

Notable wrestlers
Aobayama Hirotoshi – best rank (komusubi)
Tengoyama Takakiyo - best rank (juryo)

References

Defunct sumo stables